Sena II was King of Anuradhapura in the 9th century, whose reign lasted from 853 to 887. He succeeded his uncle Sena I as King of Anuradhapura and was succeeded by his brother Udaya I.

The lost treasures during Sena I's reign to Pandyan invaders were restored by King Sena II. He readied a large army for retribution from Pandyas (Tamil invaders) when a disappointed prince from Pandyan dynasty sought his help.

Sena II sent a large force under his Commander to besiege Madura, capture it and install the Pandyan prince on the throne. Madura was duly besieged, stormed and captured with the reigning Pandyan king killed. The Commander recovered all the treasures lost from Sri Lanka and returned to a hero's welcome.

The Army had brought a heresy from India called 'Neelapata Darshanaya'. However, this did not take root.

King Sena II secured the country against another Tamil invasion. He restored and built new tanks, revived Buddhist festivals and repaired Temples and made liberal offerings to them.

See also
 List of Sri Lankan monarchs
 History of Sri Lanka

References
History of Ceylon - L.E. Blaze

External links
 Kings & Rulers of Sri Lanka
 Codrington's Short History of Ceylon

Monarchs of Anuradhapura
S
S
S
S